Escape to River Cottage was the first River Cottage television series in which celebrity chef Hugh Fearnley-Whittingstall takes over a Dorset cottage and sets out to achieve a form of rural self-sufficiency.

Show summary

Along the way, Fearnley-Whittingstall encounters many challenges largely caused by the weather and pests. Every week, Fearnley-Whittingstall meets up with different members of the Dorset community and gets a different kind of livestock (e.g., fish, pork) from each of them, usually free or bartered. Local organic vegetable guru Michael Michaud, homecraft expert Barbara and experienced vegetable competitor Roy Gunning all make appearances as the series provides insight into country life.

List of episodes

References

External links

Channel 4 original programming
1999 British television series debuts
1999 British television series endings